Remy June McBain (born ) is a Puerto Rican female volleyball player. She was part of the Puerto Rico women's national volleyball team. She has been an assistant coach at Lake Erie College since 2015.

She participated in the 2013 FIVB Volleyball World Grand Prix.
On club level she played for Mayaguez in 2013.

References

External links
 Profile at FIVB.org

1991 births
Living people
Puerto Rican women's volleyball players
Place of birth missing (living people)
Setters (volleyball)
Maryland Terrapins women's volleyball players